Terry Du'Aun Allen (born December 29, 1993) is an American professional basketball player for ESSM Le Portel of the LNB Pro A. He played college basketball for the University of Richmond before playing professionally in Hungary, France and Israel.

Early life and college career
Allen attended Manvel High School in Manvel, Texas. He played college basketball for the University of Richmond's Spiders.

In his senior year at Richmond, Allen averaged 17.1 points, 7.6 rebounds, 2.1 assists and 1.6 steals per game.

On March 8, 2016, Allen was named 2016 All-Atlantic 10 Third Team.

Professional career

EGIS Körmend (2016–2017)
On August 14, 2016, Allen started his professional career with the Hungarian team EGIS Körmend, signing a one-year deal. On November 8, 2016, Allen recorded a career-high 37 points, shooting 15-of-23 from the field, along with seven rebounds and two assists in a 92–75 win over Limburg United. He was subsequently named FIBA Europe Cup Round 4 Top Performer.

Allen helped Körmend reach the 2017 Hungarian League Semifinals, as well as the 2017 FIBA Europe Cup Round of 16, where they eventually lost to Élan Chalon. In 53 game played during the 2016–17 season, he averaged 17.4 points, 5.6 rebounds, 2 assists and 1.2 steals per game.

Gravelines-Dunkerque (2017–2018)
On June 16, 2017, Allen signed a one-year deal with the French team BCM Gravelines-Dunkerque. On July 1, 2017, Allen joined the Utah Jazz for the 2017 NBA Summer League. On October 21, 2017, Allen recorded a season-high 32 points, shooting 13-of-17 from the field, along with four rebounds in a 75–74 win over Élan Chalon.

Ironi Nahariya (2018–2019)
On July 9, 2018, Allen signed with the Israeli team Ironi Nahariya for the 2018–19 season. On February 28, 2019, Allen recorded a season-high 25 points, shooting 11-of-17 from the field, in a 75–93 loss to Hapoel Eilat. In 33 games played for Nahariya, he averaged 11.9 points, 5.4 rebounds and 2.1 assists per game.

Göttingen (2019–2020)
On July 29, 2019, Allen signed a one-year deal with the German team BG Göttingen. He averaged 10.7 points, 3.7 rebounds and 1.3 assists per game and was voted to Eurobasket.com All-German Bundesliga Honorable Mention.

Hamburg Towers (2020–2021)
On August 15, 2020, Allen signed with the German team Hamburg Towers.

Medi Bayreuth (2021–2022)
On July 15, 2021, Allen signed a one-year deal with the German team Medi Bayreuth.

ESSM Le Portel (2022–present) 
On July 15, 2022, Allen signed with ESSM Le Portel of the LNB Pro A.

References

External links
Richmond Spiders bio
RealGM Profile

1993 births
Living people
American expatriate basketball people in France
American expatriate basketball people in Germany
American expatriate basketball people in Hungary
American expatriate basketball people in Israel
American men's basketball players
Basketball players from Houston
BC Körmend players
BCM Gravelines players
BG Göttingen players
ESSM Le Portel players
Hamburg Towers players
Ironi Nahariya players
Medi Bayreuth players
Power forwards (basketball)
Richmond Spiders men's basketball players
Small forwards